The Lanitz 3W 342 iB2 TS (sometimes written 3W-342iB2 TS) is a German aircraft engine, designed and produced by Lanitz Aviation of Leipzig for use in ultralight aircraft.

By March 2018, the engine was no longer advertised on the company website and seems to be out of production.

Design and development
The engine is a twin-cylinder two-stroke, horizontally-opposed,  displacement, air-cooled, gasoline engine design, with a poly V belt reduction drive. It employs dual electronic ignition and produces  at 6500 rpm.

Applications
Lanitz Escapade One

Specifications (3W 342 iB2 TS)

See also

References

Lanitz aircraft engines
Two-stroke aircraft piston engines
Air-cooled aircraft piston engines
2010s aircraft piston engines